Walter Allen Blair (October 13, 1883 – August 20, 1948), nicknamed "Heavy", was an American catcher in Major League Baseball player born in Landrus, Pennsylvania who, after attending Bucknell University, played as a backup catcher for the New York Highlanders from  through . It was for this team that he did appear as manager for two games, a doubleheader played on June 4, 1915, his team won one and lost one.

Following his playing career he served as a baseball coach at the University of Pittsburgh and Bucknell University. He was inducted into the Bucknell Hall of Fame in 1987. Walter died at the age of 64 in Lewisburg, Pennsylvania, and was buried at the Lewisburg City Cemetery.

See also

List of Major League Baseball player–managers

References

External links

1883 births
1948 deaths
Baseball players from Pennsylvania
Major League Baseball catchers
New York Highlanders players
Buffalo Buffeds players
Buffalo Blues players
Minor league baseball managers
Corsicana Oil Citys players
Paris Parasites players
Ardmore Territorians players
Temple Boll Weevils players
Williamsport Millionaires players
Newark Indians players
Rochester Bronchos players
Rochester Hustlers players
Jersey City Skeeters players
Bucknell Bison baseball coaches
Pittsburgh Panthers baseball coaches
Major League Baseball player-managers